Friuli-Venezia Giulia is one of the 20 regions of Italy and one of five autonomous regions with special statute. The regional capital is Trieste on the Gulf of Trieste, a very shallow bay of the Adriatic Sea.

The city of Venice ( in Italian) is not in this region, despite the name. 

A natural opening to the sea for many central European countries, the region is traversed by the major transport routes between the east and west of Southern Europe. It encompasses the historical-geographical region of Friuli and a small portion of the historical region of  – also known in English as the Julian March – each with its own distinct history, traditions and identity.

History

In Roman times, modern Friuli Venezia Giulia was located within Regio X Venetia et Histria of Roman Italy. The traces of its Roman origin are visible all over the area. In fact, the city of Aquileia, founded in 181 BC, served as regional capital and rose to prominence in the Augustan era.

Following the Lombard settlements in the 6th century, the historical paths of Friuli and Venezia Giulia began to diverge. In 568, Cividale del Friuli (the Roman Forum Iulii (from which the name Friuli is derived)) became the capital of the first Lombard dukedom in Italy. In 774, the Franks, favored the growth of the church of Aquileia and established Cividale as a march. In 1077, the Holy Roman Emperor recognized the territorial powers of the Patriarchate of Aquileia that temporarily extended its rule to areas to the east. Already in the 12th century Gorizia had become independent and Trieste, along with other coastal towns, developed into a free city-state.

In the 6th century, the Alpine Slavs, ancestors of present-day Slovenes, settled the eastern areas of the region. They settled in the easternmost mountainous areas of Friuli known as the Friulian Slavia, as well as in the Kras Plateau and in the area north and south of Gorizia. In the 12th and 13th centuries they also moved closer to Trieste.

Friuli became Venetian territory in 1420, while Trieste and Gorizia remained within the Holy Roman Empire. Pordenone was a "corpus separatum", under Austrian influence until 1515, when it also fell to Venetian rule. With the 1797 Peace treaty of Campoformido, the Venetian domination came to an end and Friuli was ceded to Austria. After the period of domination by Napoleon, which affected also Trieste and Gorizia, it again became part of the Austrian Empire and was included in the Lombard-Veneto Kingdom. Gorizia was assigned to the Illyrian Kingdom, whereas Trieste and Istria became part of the Austrian Coastal Region. Under the enlightened government and policies set by the Austrian Empire and continued by the Austrian-Hungarian Empire in the 18th and 19th centuries, Trieste flourished, reaching an extraordinary economic development as the main harbour of the Habsburg empire. The war of independence led to the annexation of Friuli to the Kingdom of Italy.

During the First World War, the region was a prominent theatre for military operations and suffered serious damage and loss of lives. After the war, these borderlands were united within the Kingdom of Italy, although Venezia Giulia's borders were the subject of an international dispute.

The Second World War led to the creation of the Anglo-American Administration in Trieste until the border was defined in the 1954 Memorandum of London. After Trieste was reassigned to Italy, the Autonomous Region of Friuli Venezia Giulia was finally established.

The region's name was Friuli-Venezia Giulia (hyphenated) until 2001, when the official spelling Friuli Venezia Giulia (without hyphen) was adopted following the modification of Article No.116 of the Italian Constitution. The term "Venezia Giulia" was coined by Graziadio Isaia Ascoli.

Geography

Friuli Venezia Giulia is Italy's north-easternmost region. It covers an area of 7,858 km2 and is the fifth smallest region of the country. It borders Austria to the north and Slovenia to the east. To the south it faces the Adriatic Sea and to the west the Veneto region.

The region spans a wide variety of climates and landscapes from the mild Oceanic in the south to Alpine continental in the north. The total area is subdivided into a 42.5% mountainous-alpine terrain in the north, 19.3% is hilly, mostly to the south-east, while the remaining 38.2% comprises the central and coastal plains.

Morphologically the region can be subdivided into four main areas. The mountainous area in the north: this part of the region includes Carnia and the ending section of the Alps (Carnic Alps and Julian Alps), of which the highest peaks exceed 2,700 m above sea level (Jôf di Montasio 2,754 m). Its landscapes are characterised by vast pine forests and pastures, mountain lakes (e.g. Sauris, Fusine and Barcis) and numerous streams and small rivers descending from the mountains. 

The area is also known for its tourist destinations, especially during the winter season (Monte Zoncolan, Tarvisio, Sella Nevea, Forni di Sopra and Piancavallo). The hilly area is situated to the south of the mountains and along the central section of the border with Slovenia. The main product of agriculture in this area is wine, whose quality, especially the white, is known worldwide. The easternmost part of the hilly area is also known as Slavia Friulana, as it is mostly inhabited by ethnic Slovenes. 

The central plains are characterised by poor, arid and permeable soil. The soil has been made fertile with an extensive irrigation system and through the adoption of modern intensive farming techniques. In this part of the region most of the agricultural activities are concentrated. The coastal area can be further subdivided in two, western-eastern, subsections separated by the river Isonzo's estuary. 

To the west, the coast is shallow and sandy, with numerous tourist resorts and the lagoons of Grado and Marano Lagunare. To the east, the coastline rises into cliffs, where the Karst Plateau meets the Adriatic, all the way to Trieste and Muggia on the border with Slovenia. The Carso has geological features and phenomena such as hollows, cave networks and underground rivers, which extend inland in the provinces of Trieste and Gorizia, with an altitude ranging between 300m and 600m.

The rivers of the region flow from the North and from Slovenia into the Adriatic. The two main rivers are the Tagliamento, which flows west–east in its upper part in the Carnic Alps and then bends into a north–south flow that separates the Julian Alps from Alpine foothills and the Isonzo (Slovenian: Soča) which flows from Slovenia into Italy. The Timavo is an underground river that flows for 38 km from Slovenia and resurfaces near its mouth north-west of Duino.

The region Friuli Venezia Giulia has a temperate climate. However, due to the terrain's diversity, it varies considerably from one area to another. Walled by the Alps on its northern flank, the region is exposed to air masses from the East and the West. The region receives also the southerly Sirocco from the Adriatic sea, which brings in heavy rainfall. Along the coast the climate is mild and pleasant. 

Trieste records the smallest temperature differences between winter and summer and between day and night. The climate is Alpine-continental in the mountainous areas, where, in some locations, the coldest winter temperatures in Italy can often be found. The Kras plateau has its own weather and climate, influenced, mostly during autumn and winter, by masses of cold air coming from the north-east. These generate a very special feature of the local climate: the north-easterly wind Bora, which descends onto the Gulf of Trieste with gusts occasionally exceeding speeds of 150 km/h.

Economy

The Gross domestic product (GDP) of the region was 38 billion euros in 2018, accounting for 2.2% of Italy's economic output. GDP per capita adjusted for purchasing power was 31,200 euros or 103% of the EU27 average in the same year. The GDP per employee was 106% of the EU average.

The economy of Friuli Venezia Giulia is one of the most developed in the country. Its core is based on small and middle-size enterprises (the so-called 'North-East model'), on specialized farming and on high-quality tourism with a significant inclination towards exports.

Agriculture and farming maintain an essential role in the economy of the region and employed in 2001 around 95,000 persons. Its products are exported not only within the country and Europe (fruit and vegetable, cheese) but have become known worldwide for their acclaimed quality (cured ham and wines, especially white ones). Noteworthy is also the production of soy (third producer in Italy with more than 37,000 hectares cultivated in 2000) and timber production in Carnia.

The economy of the region is based on a widespread mosaic of small and medium-sized enterprises; of particular importance are the four industrial districts where a multitude of such highly specialised enterprises are concentrated. These districts are centred around the towns of Manzano, San Daniele del Friuli (cured ham), Maniago (knives), and Brugnera (furniture). Several large enterprises are also present in the region in both the industry and services sectors. Some of these companies are world leaders in their relevant sectors; such are Fincantieri (headquarters in Trieste with shipyards in Monfalcone) for the construction of the world's largest cruise ships, Zanussi-Electrolux (Pordenone) in the production of electrical appliances, Danieli, Eurotech, Illy, Rizzani de Eccher, Solari di Udine, TBS Group, Banca Generali, Genertellife, Italia Marittima, Telit, Wärtsilä, Allianz Italia and Assicurazioni Generali in Trieste, a leading insurance company in the world.

In the services sector, the city of Trieste plays a leading role (with knock-on effects on the other provincial capitals); it is here that activities such as the regional government, large banking, and insurance companies are concentrated.  

The unemployment rate stood at 5.7% in 2020.

Transport 
With its commercial Free Port, Trieste also plays an essential role in the trade sector: special custom regulations ensure exclusive financial conditions to operators. The Port of Trieste is today the most important centre worldwide for the trade of coffee and plays a strategic key role in trade with northern and eastern Europe-

Although small in size, Friuli Venezia Giulia has always been 'in the centre of Europe' and has played an important role in connecting Italy (and the Mediterranean) to Central and Eastern Europe. Its role will become even more strategic as a logistical platform with the imminent enlargement of the European Union. Hence the importance of the infrastructure network of the region, which can today be considered first rate in quality and diversity. The motorway network consists of more than 200 km that run from North to South and from West to East, connecting the region to Austria and Slovenia.

The railway network consists of around 500 km of track, with the two twin-line 'backbones' Venice-Trieste and Trieste-Udine-Tarvisio-Austria. The motorway and railway networks are linked to the ports of Trieste, Monfalcone and Porto Nogaro, the three most northerly ports of the Mediterranean. Trieste, in particular, has a free port for goods since 1719. It is the Italian port with the greatest capacity for covered storage, with a surface area of more than 2 million square meters and 70 km of rail tracks. Intermodality is guaranteed by the Cervignano terminal, in operation since 1988, to serve the increasing commercial traffic between Italy and Eastern European countries.

The regional airport of Ronchi dei Legionari is situated 30 km from Trieste and 40 km from Udine and is closely connected to the motorway and railway networks. The airport offers regular national and international flights including destinations in Eastern Europe. The region is now placing much of its hopes for future economic development in the construction of a high speed European Transport Corridor n° V connecting Lyon, Turin, Venice, Trieste, Ljubljana, Budapest and Kiev, so as to improve the traffic of goods and services with new EU partners.

Demographics

Population density is lower than the national average: In 1978 there were in total only 1,224,611 inhabitants; in 2008 it was 157.5 inhabitants per km2 (compared to 198.8 for Italy as a whole). However, density varies from a minimum of 106 inhabitants per km2 in the province of Udine to a maximum of 1,144 inhabitants per km2 in the province of Trieste.

The negative natural balance in the region is partly made up by the positive net migration. To some extent the migratory surplus has in fact offset the downward trend in the population since 1975. In 2008, the resident population with foreign nationality registered in the region accounted to 83,306 persons (6.7% of the total population).

Government and politics

A special Italian statute of 31 January 1963 effective 16 February 1963 constituted Friuli Venezia Giulia as an autonomous region within the Italian Republic.

The President of Regional Government is the region's head of government. In the latest regional election, which took place on 4 March 2018, Massimiliano Fedriga of the Lega Nord Friuli-Venezia Giulia was elected president by a landslide.

Administrative divisions
Like most of the rest of Italy, Friuli Venezia Giulia was previously divided into four provinces: Gorizia, Pordenone, Trieste and Udine. The first three were abolished on 30 September 2017, while the Province of Udine remained active until 22 April 2018.

In anticipation of this 2017 and 2018 abolition of the provinces in Friuli Venezia Giulia, the Regional Council created a system of 18 Intermunicipal Territorial Unions (or UTI). The UTIs have taken on the local services that the municipalities previously managed, extending across the larger area managed by each UTI, while also taking on some responsibilities previously managed by the provinces; this handling of "wide area local development policies" by the UTIs was conceived as a way allow more focused planning and budgeting for the 215 comuni, divided across the 18 UTIs, than would be possible on a region-wide basis by the Regional Council.

The Regional Council also passed a statute which allows, should it desire at some future point, for the establishment of the regional capital of Triestewith smaller surrounding townsas a metropolitan city administering wide area local development policies.

Intermunicipal Territorial Unions (UTI)

(*) These municipalities have not yet signed the statute of the UTI to which they belong.

Former provinces (abolished by 2018)

Until 2017–18, Friuli Venezia Giulia was divided into four provinces. The Regional Council voted to abolish them effective 30 September 2017, though the provincial council of the largest, Udine, carried on some administrative responsibilities until 22 April 2018.

Culture

Language
The official languages of the region are Italian, Friulian, Slovene and German.

Italian is the official national language. Friulian language is also spoken in most of the region – with a few exceptions, most notably Trieste and the area around Monfalcone and Grado, where a version of the Venetian language and Triestine dialect is spoken instead.

Venetian is also spoken in western part of the Province of Pordenone, and in the city of Pordenone itself, due to its proximity with the Veneto region. Friulian and Venetian are more common in the countryside, while standard Italian is the predominant language in the larger towns (Udine, Pordenone, Gorizia). The region is also home to Italy's Slovene-speaking minority.

Historical flag
A very popular symbol among the Friulian community (mostly identified with the friulian-speaking population in the provinces of Udine, Pordenone and Gorizia and the numerous expat communities around the world) is the Friulian Historical Flag, to which the official regional flag is roughly inspired, being somehow a modern interpretation of it. The official, modern "Friuli-Venezia Giulia" flag logo was issued in 1967–1968 (and adopted in 2001) to represent the region which in 1963 took the administrative setup of today. The historical symbol of the eagle dates back to (at least) the 13th century, the time of the Patriarchate of Aquileia.

Gallery

Notes

References

External links

 "Turismo in Friuli Venezia Giulia 2018" Guide. For translation, click "Translate" button at bottom of screen.
 Official site of the Autonomous Region of Friuli Venezia Giulia (Italian, Friulan, Slovene, German, English) 
 Official site of the Autonomous Region of Friuli Venezia Giulia 
 fvg.INFO (Italian, English, German)
 Giro FVG – Rivista turistica, web, App iPhone, iPad, iPod del Friuli Venezia Giulia (Italian)
 Friuli Tipico (Italian, English)
 Map of Friuli Venezia Giulia
  (Italian, English, German)
 Airport of Friuli Venezia Giulia (Italian, English, Slovene)
  (Italian, Friulan, Slovene, German, English)

 
Friuli-Venezia Giulia
Regions of Italy
Autonomous regions of Italy
NUTS 2 statistical regions of the European Union
Hungarian diaspora in Italy